Access may refer to:

Companies and organizations
 ACCESS (Australia), an Australian youth network
 Access (credit card), a former credit card in the United Kingdom
 Access Co., a Japanese software company
 Access Healthcare, an Indian BPO services provider
 Access International Advisors, a hedge fund
 AirCraft Casualty Emotional Support Services
 Arab Community Center for Economic and Social Services
 Access, the Alphabet division containing Google Fiber
 Access, the Southwest Ohio Regional Transit Authority's paratransit service

Sailing
 Access 2.3, a sailing keelboat
 Access 303, a sailing keelboat
 Access Liberty, a sailing keelboat

Television
 Access Hollywood, formerly Access, an American entertainment newsmagazine
 Access (British TV programme), a British entertainment television programme
 Access (Canadian TV series), a Canadian television series (1974–1982)
 Access TV, a former Canadian educational television channel (1973–2011)
 Access Television Network, an American infomercial channel
 "Access" (The West Wing), an episode of The West Wing

Other uses
 Access (EP), a 2022 EP by Acid Angel from Asia
 Access (group), a Japanese pop duo
 "Access" (song), a 2018 song by Martin Garrix
 Access 5, a NASA program
 Access Linux Platform, an operating system for mobile devices
 Access network, the process of signing onto a network
 Access Virus, a German musical device
 Experimental Assembly of Structures in EVA and Assembly Concept for Construction of Erectable Space Structures (EASE and ACCESS), a pair of space shuttle flight experiments
 Internet access, the hardware and connections needed to use the internet
 Microsoft Access, a database program which is part of the Office suite

See also
 Accessibility
 AccessNow.org, a U.S.-based non-profit organization
 Advanced Civil Speed Enforcement System (ACSES)
 Axes (disambiguation)
 Axess (disambiguation)
 Axxess (disambiguation)
 Computer data storage
 Coverage (disambiguation)
 File system permissions
 Public, educational, and government access, American public, educational and government (PEG) access cable TV channels